Live at The Trades is a solo live album by John Bramwell. It was released on 25 January 2014 and made available only at Bramwell's live shows. At the end of April 2015, the album was released via Shedhead Records in the form of blue and black vinyl and a gatefold sleeve compact disc.

The recording consists of material recorded during Bramwell's concert at The Trades Club, Hebden Bridge, in June 2013. All the songs belong to I Am Kloot's repertoire.

The track "Fingerprints" is available as a free download after subscribing to the newsletter at www.johnbramwell.com.

Track listing

References

External links 
 The Trades Club

2014 live albums
John Bramwell albums